In mathematics, the Selberg integral is a generalization of Euler beta function to n dimensions introduced by  .

Selberg's integral formula

Selberg's formula  implies Dixon's identity for well poised hypergeometric series, and some special cases of Dyson's conjecture.

Aomoto's integral formula
 proved a slightly more general integral formula:

Mehta's integral
Mehta's integral is 

It is the partition function for a gas of point charges moving on a line that are attracted to the origin . 
Its value can be deduced from that of the Selberg integral, and is 

Macdonald's integral
 conjectured the following extension of Mehta's integral to all finite root systems, Mehta's original case corresponding to the An−1 root system. 

The product is over the  roots r of the roots system and the numbers dj are the degrees of the generators of the ring of invariants of the reflection group. 
 gave a uniform proof for all crystallographic reflection groups. Several years later he proved it in full generality, making use of computer-aided calculations by Garvan.

References
 (Chapter 8)
  

Special functions